Knefastia princeps is a species of sea snail, a marine gastropod mollusk in the family Pseudomelatomidae, the turrids and allies. This magnificent species, one of the finest in a generally striking genus, appears nearest to K. dalli Bartsch among described forms, differing in its larger size, more slender form, the relatively longer and attenuate canal, the slender and well-spaced spiral cords, the very much fewer and less nodulous axial ribs, the more open sinus, and the warmer and brighter coloring, especially of the interior. The single example taken was dredged up alive.

Description
A fusiform shell that is moderately large and elongated. larval shell decollated in holotype but persisting whorls 81/^, turreted, strongly convex, sloping above to a high, subangulate shoulder; a flattened fold-like ridge strongly appressed against the suture is subtended by a shallow spiral furrow in the rather wide anal fasciole, the latter sculptured otherwise mainly by the very strong and coarse incremental striae and a few weak traces of low spirals; body of whorl marked by from 7 to 8 massive axial ribs (there are 7 on the last whorl) which are slightly knobbed on the shoulder, and 4 low but strong spiral ridges which over-ride both the axial ribs and their interspaces, the two central ridges being a trifle more widely separated than either is from its outer neighbor; base with about 13 or 14 gradually weakening spirals; the axial ribs pass onto the base but become obsolescent in the region of the canal. Aperture unarmored, about 45% the length of the shell, elongate-pyriform, acute posteriorly; outer lip sharp-edged, hardly crenulated by the spiral ridges, its margin convex in front of the strong open anal notch which nearly subtends the end of the suture. The canal is open and fairly long. The columellar wall is somewhat erose parietally, covered with a moderate wash of shining enamel. Periostracum is shining, the spire and main portion of body-whorl lustrous Antique Brown, paling anteriorly and on the nodes to Raw Umber, the spiral ridges sharply paler and the anterior portion of the shell as well, even to Chamois at the extreme portion and on the spirals, with one or two darker bands under the periphery. The interior is polished and bright, near Cinnamon to a Pinkish Cinnamon. Operculum is a little smaller than the aperture, it is acute in front and more blunt posteriorly, with a shallow furrow that is running parallel to the inner margin. The length of the holotype is 60.3 mm, its diameter 19.9 mm.

Distribution
This marine species occurs from Baja California, Mexico, to Peru, in pebble, mud and shell bottoms.

References

 Berry, Samuel Stillman. "Notices of new west American marine Mollusca." San Diego Society of Natural History, vol. 11, 1953

External links
 
 Gastropods.com: Knefastia princeps

princeps
Gastropods described in 1953